Milić Stanković (1934 – 2000), known by his artistic name Milić of Mačva (Milić od Mačve; 30 October 1934 – 8 December 2000), was a Serbian painter and artist often named Balkan's Dalí for his figurative surrealist paintings.

Biography
Stanković was born in 1934 in Belotić, Kingdom of Yugoslavia.

When he was in the second year of high school in the town of Šabac, a professor of drawing, Đorđe Kostić came to Šabac from Belgrade, demolished after the Nazi bombardment. Kostić founded the art section in the basement of the high school. The professor had a special ability of perceiving children gifted in painting, including Milić. As a high school student, Milić participated at painting exhibitions in the town.

Because of poverty, his parents decided that he should  attend the Military Academy in Belgrade. Milić was accepted, but at the last moment, managed to convince his parents that architecture would be better for him and more promising for the future. Young Milić had talent and good will, and now it became important for him to remain in Belgrade. At the School of Architecture, he was taught by an extraordinary draughtsman - Pivo Karamatijević.
The first year, he lived in the Students' City, New Belgrade.

In the fall of 1953 Milić began socializing with the family of Đorđe Kadijević.
Milić and Đorđe were constantly fantasizing about painting. The next year, Milić passed the entrance exam to  the Academy of Fine Arts, in contrast to Kadijević, who did not pass it.

Milić received support from his mother Desanka for admission to the Academy, and he was especially encouraged by his high school classmate Vlada Lalicki, from Šabac. Later, as a specially gifted student, he received a scholarship. At the Academy of Fine Arts, he studied in the class of professor Kosta Hakman, and after Hakman's death, with professor Ljubica Sokić. 
Milić graduated from the Academy in 1959

On Milić's first solo exhibition, Herbert Beck, a famous collector  from Geneva bought seven of his paintings for 770,000 dinars, a significant amount at the time.

Milić was a very prolific painter. As of February 2000, he had painted around 7,500 paintings, more than 13,000 graphics and hundreds of icons and frescoes. By his works he defended the Serbian tradition from oblivion and distortion.

He died on December 8, 2000 in Belgrade, Federal Republic of Yugoslavia.

References

20th-century Serbian people
Mačva
Artists from Šabac
1934 births
2000 deaths
20th-century Serbian painters
Burials at Belgrade New Cemetery
Serbian male painters
20th-century Serbian male artists